Stade Lamine Guèye is a multi-use stadium in Kaolack, Senegal.   it was used mostly for football matches and served as a home ground of ASC Saloum. The stadium holds 8,000 people.

In 2008, one of the two continental matches took place at the stadium.

References

Lamine Gueye